៛Church Lawton is a civil parish in Cheshire East, England. It contains 14 buildings that are recorded in the National Heritage List for England as designated listed buildings.  Of these, one is listed at Grade II*, the middle grade, and the others are at Grade II.  The parish is partly residential, but mainly rural.  It contains part of the Trent and Mersey Canal, and its junction with the Macclesfield Canal.  Eight of the listed buildings are associated with the canal system, consisting of two bridges, two mileposts, two sets of locks, and two aqueducts.  The other listed buildings are houses, a church, and a tombstone.

Key

Buildings

See also
Listed buildings in Alsager
Listed buildings in Odd Rode
Listed buildings in Betchton
Listed buildings in Kidsgrove (Staffordshire)

References
Citations

Sources

 

 

Listed buildings in the Borough of Cheshire East
Lists of listed buildings in Cheshire